Khin Maung Myint also Maung Cho (born 28 December  1951) is a Burmese politician currently serves as an Amyotha Hluttaw MP for Kachin State No. 9 constituency. He is a member of the National League for Democracy.

Early life and education
He was born on 28 December 1951 in Katha, Sagaing Region, Myanmar. His previous job is jade trading.

Political career
He is a member of the National League for Democracy. In the 2015 Myanmar general election, he was elected as an Amyotha Hluttaw MP, winning a majority of 30825 votes and elected representative from Kachin  State No. 9 parliamentary constituency.

References

National League for Democracy politicians
1951 births
Living people
People from Sagaing Region